"Other ranks" (abbreviated "ORs") is the term used to refer to all ranks below officers in the British Army and the Royal Marines. It includes warrant officers, non-commissioned officers ("NCOs") and ordinary soldiers with the rank of private or regimental equivalent. Officers may, in speaking, distinguish themselves from those "in the ranks".

History 
During the 18th century corporals might indicate their ranks with a knot with cord loops on their right shoulder and, from 1768, an epaulette instead. Sergeants had clothing that was of slightly better quality and wore lace trim on their hats and uniforms. Infantry sergeants were armed with fusils (grenadier companies, from 1769), halberds or, from 1792 until 1830, with spontoons. They, as well as their counterparts in cavalry and artillery, were also permitted sashes of crimson wool, with a single stripe of facing colour following the clothing regulations of 1727. Whereas it remained vague as to whether the sash was to be worn over the shoulder or around the waist, it was clarified in 1747 that sergeants had to wear their sashes around the waist. From 1768, the sergeant's waist sash had stripes of facing colour  one (until 1825) resp. three (until 1845); in regiments with red or purple facings the sergeant's sash had white stripes or remained plain crimson. Sergeants of highland regiments wore their sashes over the left shoulder and tied at the right hip in the same manner as the officers. Beginning from the same year, sergeants wore a pair of silk epaulettes with fringe while sergeant-majors had a pair of gold or silver laced epaulettes with bullion fringe.

The chevrons worn by many non-commissioned officers are based on heraldic devices and their current use originates from 1802. As today, sergeants wore three chevrons, point downwards, on the upper arm, and corporals wore two, with sergeant-majors and quarter-master-sergeants then having four. Whereas corporals and sergeants discarded their silk epaulettes by now, sergeant-majors continued to wear their metal epaulettes along with their new chevrons for a while. Lance corporal, at the time, not a rank but an appointment is historically known as chosen man and carrying extra pay for privates holding it, were given a single chevron a few years later, and later in the century, the lance-sergeant appeared, wearing three chevrons. The infantry rank of colour sergeant was created in 1813 as a reward for senior sergeants with one allowed per company. He was allowed to wear a badge consisting of a regimental colour supported by two crossed swords.

The Royal Artillery had the special rank of bombardier below the corporal, and both he and the acting bombardier wore one chevron. The Royal Engineers and Army Ordnance Corps also had an additional rank of second corporal, who wore one chevron. On full-dress tunics, badges in white or gold lace were worn only on the right arm, but on service dress jackets, badges in worsted embroidery were worn on both arms. In February 1918 the acting bombardier was renamed lance-bombardier, and the full bombardier gained a second chevron in 1920 replacing the rank of corporal in the RA. Second corporals also disappeared at that time (the second corporal had been an actual rank, whereas lance-corporal was private acting in the rank of corporal).

The pre-war infantry rank of colour sergeant had generally given way to the ranks of company sergeant-major and quartermaster-sergeant in 1914 when the four-company organization was introduced. Both of these ranks, their squadron, and battery equivalents, and staff-sergeants in other arms, wore three chevrons and a crown, although, in 1915 company, battery, squadron, and troop sergeant-majors became warrant officers class II (by Army Order 70) and thereafter wore a single large crown, without any chevrons, on each forearm. The designation of warrant officer classes was in Roman rather than Arabic numerals until the latter half of the 20th century.

Regimental quartermaster-sergeants wore four chevrons on the lower sleeve, point upwards, with an eight-pointed star above, but adopted the crown when they too became warrant officers class II in 1915. In their case, however, the crown was surrounded by a wreath. Regimental sergeant-majors, who before the Boer War had worn four chevrons with a crown, were given in 1902 the badge of a single large crown on the lower arm but adopted a small version of the Royal arms in its place in 1915 when they became warrant officers class I.

Certain senior grades of warrant officer were also peculiar to the specialist branches, which ranked above regimental sergeant-majors. These were the conductors of the Army Ordnance Corps and the first-class staff sergeant-majors of the Army Service Corps and the Army Pay Corps. They also wore a large crown, surrounded by a wreath, on the lower arm, although in 1918 this was replaced by the Royal Arms within a wreath. The RA also had its master gunners in three classes, but these were technical specialists and not normally seen in the field. The Royal Arms within a wreath is the badge of rank for a conductor, the most senior of all WO1 appointments, confined to the Royal Logistic Corps and held by fewer than twenty people as of 2004.

From 1938, there was also a rank of warrant officer class III. The only appointments held by this rank were platoon sergeant major, troop sergeant major, and section sergeant major. The WOIII wore a crown on his lower sleeve. The rank was placed in suspension in 1940 and no new appointments were made, but it was never officially abolished. From 1938 to 1947 all WOII ranks wore the crown in wreath rank now worn by regimental quartermaster sergeants.

The grades of lance-sergeant and lance-corporal were not strictly ranks but were appointments, held by selected corporals and privates, and usually carrying extra pay. The appointment was made by the man's commanding officer and could be taken away by him for disciplinary reasons, unlike full sergeants and corporals who could only be demoted by order of a court-martial. It is only since 1961 that lance-corporal has been a separate rank in its own right, and the appointment of lance-sergeant was discontinued in 1946, except in the Foot Guards and Honourable Artillery Company (and its equivalent, lance-corporal of the horse, in the Household Cavalry).

Ranks

General rank information

Variants 
As most units in the British Army have long traditions (some dating as far back as the 1600s) some variation has developed in the terminology and insignia used for non-commissioned ranks, most notably in the Foot Guards and Household Cavalry. Many units do not use the rank "Private", using instead:

 "Trooper" in many regiments with a cavalry tradition and in the Special Air Service
 "Airtrooper" in the Army Air Corps
 "Sapper" in the Royal Engineers
 "Craftsman" in the Royal Electrical and Mechanical Engineers
 "Guardsman" in the six Foot Guards regiments
 "Gunner" in the Royal Artillery and Royal Horse Artillery
 "Fusilier" in the Royal Regiment of Fusiliers, Royal Welsh and The Royal Highland Fusiliers, 2nd Battalion, The Royal Regiment of Scotland
 "Rifleman" in The Rifles and the Royal Gurkha Rifles 
 "Kingsman" in the Duke of Lancaster's Regiment
 "Signaller” in the Royal Signals
 “Ranger” in the Royal Irish Regiment, London Irish Rifles and the Ranger Regiment
 "Highlander" in The Highlanders, 4th Battalion, The Royal Regiment of Scotland
 "Drummer", "Trumpeter", "Bugler", "Piper" and "Musician" in various military bands and musicians in other units

The Royal Artillery and RHA also uses the ranks Gunner instead of Private, and Lance Bombardier and Bombardier instead of Lance Corporal and Corporal, while The Rifles use the spelling "Serjeant" in place of "Sergeant".

Foot Guards and Honourable Artillery Company

Household Cavalry 
The Household Cavalry maintains the old cavalry tradition of having no rank of sergeant, which was originally an infantry rank only. It has its own peculiar set of insignia and ranks with the following equivalents:

Similarly, warrant officer appointments are different, with, for example, "regimental corporal major" being used in place of regimental sergeant major. Uniquely, NCOs and warrant officers of the Household Cavalry do not wear any insignia on their full dress uniforms (although officers do). Rank is indicated by a system of aiguillettes.

Cavalry regiments 
In several cavalry regiments including the 1st The Queen's Dragoon Guards and the Queen's Royal Hussars, NCOs holding the rank of lance corporal wear two stripes. Full corporals are distinguished by the addition of a cypher above their two stripes in dress uniforms.

Staff sergeants in an appointment as squadron quartermaster sergeant in the cavalry, sometimes wear four stripes with a crown and are referred to as "sergeant major". The term "mister" is confined to WO2s.

Spelling 
The spelling serjeant is sometimes seen. This was the official spelling in the British Army and Royal Marines, although not the Royal Air Force, until the 1930s and appeared in such publications as King's Regulations and the Pay Warrant, which defined the various ranks. In common usage, the modern spelling sergeant was already more usual, as in the volumes of the Official History which began to appear in the 1920s. Serjeant-at-Arms is a title still held by members of the security staff in the Houses of Parliament. The old spelling is also retained by The Rifles, as successor to the Royal Green Jackets and The Light Infantry, which also used it.

Timeline of changes

Historical ranks 
 Sergeant-major: equivalent to the current regimental sergeant major, a warrant officer class 1
 Company sergeant-major: now an appointment of warrant officer class 2
 Quartermaster sergeant: can now be a regimental quartermaster sergeant (warrant officer class 2) or a company quartermaster sergeant (staff sergeant). In the technical corps, a WO2 can also be an AQMS (Artificer Quartermaster Sergeant), TQMS (Technical .....), or SQMS (Squadron ... )
 Warrant officer class III: a short-lived rank used between 1938 and 1940, holding the appointment of platoon sergeant major, troop sergeant major, or section sergeant major.
 Colour sergeant: gave way to staff sergeant over the years before the First World War although colour sergeant exists today in the Royal Marines, equivalent to a staff sergeant in the Army, and is still used to refer to all staff sergeants in infantry regiments and the Honourable Artillery Company.
 Lance sergeant: appointment originally given to corporals acting in the rank of sergeant, discontinued in 1946 except in the Foot Guards, Honourable Artillery Company, and some cadet units.
 Second corporal: Royal Engineers and Army Ordnance Corps rank until 1920, equivalent to lance-corporal but a substantive instead of an acting rank.
 Bombardier: until 1920, when it became equivalent to corporal, a rank in the Royal Artillery equivalent to a second corporal.
 Acting bombardier: appointment originally given to a Royal Artillery gunner acting in the rank of bombardier, discontinued in 1918 and replaced by lance-bombardier.
 Chosen man: was a rank primarily found in the Rifle Brigade denoting a marksman and/or leadership material. Became lance corporal in the early 19th century.

See also 
 British Army
 British and United States military ranks compared
 British Army officer rank insignia
 British Army uniform
 Other ranks (UK)
 Ranks of the cadet forces of the United Kingdom

References

External links 
 British Army rank structure and rank insignia (British Army website)

 
British military insignia